Timothy Dees Adams (born October 31, 1961, in Murray, Kentucky) is an American 
businessman who is president and CEO of the Institute of International Finance and former Under Secretary for International Affairs at the United States Department of the Treasury.

Education

Adams holds a B.S. in Finance, a Masters in Public Administration, and an M.A. in International Relations from the University of Kentucky.

Career
In 1993, Adams co-founded the G-7 Group, a Washington-based advisory firm. He later headed their Washington operation as managing director.

Adams served as Chief of Staff to both Treasury Secretaries Paul O'Neill and John Snow. Adams also served in the White House under the first President Bush at the Office of Policy Development. He served as Under Secretary of Treasury for International Affairs.

Adams served as managing director of The Lindsey Group, an economic advisory firm based in Washington, DC.

Adams is president and CEO of the Institute of International Finance (IIF), a position he has held since February 2013. The IIF represents more than 480 global financial institutions, including many of the world's largest banks, investment banks, and asset management firms.

References

External links
 

1961 births
Living people
George W. Bush administration personnel
United States Department of the Treasury officials
Overseas Private Investment Corporation officials
People from Murray, Kentucky